Pfefferle is a surname of South German origin. The word is a diminutive of pfeffer, and identifies a person who sells spices.

Notable people with the surname Pfefferle

Anna Pfefferle (born 1996), a collegiate volleyball player at the University of Colorado
Gérald Pfefferle (born 1960), a Swiss fencer
Markus Pfefferle, a German paralympic gold medalist in alpine skiing
William C. Pfefferle (1923-2010), an American scientist and inventor
W.T. Pfefferle (born 1962), a Canadian poet

References

German-language surnames
 Occupational surnames